William B. Gould IV (born July 16, 1936) is an American lawyer currently the Charles A. Beardsley Professor of Law, Emeritus at Stanford Law School. Gould was the first black professor at Stanford Law School. 

Gould was born on July 16, 1936, in Boston, Massachusetts to William B. Gould III and Leah F. Gould. He grew up in Long Branch, New Jersey. Gould attended the University of Rhode Island and then Cornell Law School. An Episcopalian, he was baptized at the Church of the Good Shepherd in Dedham, Massachusetts and confirmed at St. James in Long Branch.

He also served as the Chairman of the National Labor Relations Board from 1994 to 1998. In this position, he helped to negotiate then end of the 1994–95 Major League Baseball strike.  

He was responsible for the publication of the diary of his great grandfather William B. Gould, an escaped slave who served in the Union Navy during the United States Civil War. With his wife, Hilda, he has three sons, William V, Timothy, and Edward.

References

Works cited

Stanford Law School faculty
American lawyers
1936 births
Living people
University of Rhode Island alumni
Cornell Law School alumni
African-American academics
Clinton administration personnel
National Labor Relations Board officials